Alberto Sordi  (15 June 1920 – 24  February 2003) was an Italian actor, comedian, director, singer and screenwriter.

Early life
Born in Rome to a schoolteacher and a musician and the last of five children, Sordi was named in honour of an older sibling, who died several days after his birth. Sordi enrolled in Milan's dramatic arts academy but was kicked out because of his thick Roman accent. In the meantime, he studied to be a bass opera singer. His vocal distinctiveness would become his trademark.

Career

Cinema and television
In a career that spanned seven decades, Sordi established himself as an icon of Italian cinema with his representative skills at both comedy and light drama. His movie career began in the late 1930s with bit parts and secondary characters in wartime movies. Early roles included Fellini's The White Sheik in 1952, Fellini's I vitelloni (1953), a movie about young slackers, in which he plays a weak  immature loafer and a starring role in The Bachelor as a single man trying to find love. Sordi frequently appeared in Italian historical comedies.

In 1959, he appeared in Monicelli's Great War, considered by many critics and film historians to be one of the best Italian comedies. The Hollywood Foreign Press recognized his abilities when he was awarded a Golden Globe for Best Motion Picture Actor in a Musical or Comedy for To Bed or Not to Bed (1963). Sordi acted alongside Britain's David Niven in the World War II comedy The Best of Enemies. In 1965, he was in another highly regarded comedy, I complessi (Complexes).

In 1969, he was a juror at the 6th Moscow International Film Festival. In 1984, he directed and co-scripted Tutti dentro (Off to jail, everybody), in which he played a judge who has warrants for corruption served on ministers and businessmen. In 1985, he was a member of the jury at the 35th Berlin International Film Festival.

Dubbing
Sordi was also a prominent voice actor and dubber. Prior to the war he began working as a dubber for the Italian versions of many Laurel and Hardy shorts and movies, voicing Oliver Hardy after winning an MGM contest for the Italian voice nearest to that of Oliver Hardy. Sordi provided the voice of Hardy in more than forty Laurel and Hardy films from 1939 to 1951, paired with Mauro Zambuto, who voiced Stan Laurel. He also appeared as a voice actor in other Italian-language versions and Italian films.

Sordi provided voice-overs for such actors as Bruce Bennett, Anthony Quinn, John Ireland, Robert Mitchum, Pedro Armendáriz and Frank Faylen. He also dubbed Italian actors such as Franco Fabrizi, Marcello Mastroianni and Enzo Fiermonte for English-speaking audiences. His own voice was dubbed over by Gualtiero De Angelis in Cuori nella tormenta and Carlo Romano in Bullet for Stefano. Sordi ceased his career as a dubber in 1956.

Personal life
Sordi was discreet about his private life. Despite never marrying or having children, Sordi was in several relationships, including a nine-year romance with actress Andreina Pagnani.

Sordi was raised Roman Catholic.

Sordi was also a big supporter of AS Roma football team. This was something he expressed a fondness of in some of his films.

Awards
Sordi won seven David di Donatello, Italy's most prestigious film award, holding the record of David di Donatello as best actor, and four awards for his works from the Italian National Syndicate of Film Journalists. He also received a Golden Lion for lifetime achievement at the Venice Film Festival in 1995, and The Golden Globe Award for his performance as an Italian labourer stranded in Sweden in To Bed or Not to Bed. In 2000, the City of Rome made him honorary mayor for a day to celebrate his eightieth birthday.

At the 22nd Berlin International Film Festival, he won the Silver Bear for Best Actor award for Detenuto in attesa di giudizio. At the 13th Moscow International Film Festival he won a Special Prize for I Know That You Know That I Know.

Sordi received honorary citizenship from Kansas City, Missouri for his references to the city in the 1954 film, Un americano a Roma.

Illness and death
In 2001, Sordi was diagnosed with lung cancer. He died of pneumonia and bronchitis at his house in Rome on 24 February 2003. A crowd in excess of a million gathered to pay their last respects at his funeral by the Basilica of St. John Lateran.

Filmography

Actor

 Scipione l'africano (1937) as Comparsa soldato romano
 The Ferocious Saladin (1937) as The Lion
 Princess Tarakanova (1938) as Ciaruskin (uncredited)
 The Night of Tricks (1939) as Bentivoglio
 Cuori nella tormenta (1940) as Giulio Ferri
 The Hero of Venice (1941) as Aiutante del Veronese
 Le signorine della villa accanto (1941) as Un giovane invitato al ballo
 Giarabub (1942) as Il tenente Sordi
 The Three Pilots (1942) as Filippo Nardini
 La signorina (1942) as Nino
 After Casanova's Fashion (1942) as Un giocatore di biliardo
 Sant'Elena piccola isola (1943) as Il capitano Popleton
 Tre ragazze cercano marito (1944) as Giulio
 The Za-Bum Circus (1944) (segment "Galop finale al circo")
 Chi l'ha visto? (1945) as Un idraulico
 The Innocent Casimiro (1945) as Guido Corra
 His Young Wife (1945) as Camillo Barbarotti
 Il vento m'ha cantato una canzone (1947) as Paolo
 Flesh Will Surrender (1947) as Doberti
 Il Passatore (1947) as The Boyfriend
 Under the Sun of Rome (1948) as Fernando
 Che tempi! (1948) as Manuel Aguirre
 Cameriera bella presenza offresi... (1951) as Donato
 Mamma Mia, What an Impression! (1951) as Alberto
 Viva il cinema! (1952) as Narratore (voice)
 The White Sheik (1952) as Fernando Rivoli – The White Sheik
 Toto and the King of Rome (1952) as Il maestro elementare
 Giovinezza (1952) as Alberto
 The Piano Tuner Has Arrived (1952) as Avvocato Adolfo
 The Enchanting Enemy (1953) (uncredited)
 I Vitelloni (1953) as Alberto
 Cavalcade of Song (1953) as Alberto
 Ci troviamo in galleria (1953) as Mario Pio al telefono
 A Day in Court (1954) as Nando Moriconi
 Two Nights with Cleopatra (1954) as Cesarino
 Mid-Century Loves (1954) as Alberto (segment "Dopoguerra 1920")
 Marriage (1954) as Ivan Vassilievich Lomov
 Gran Varietà (1954) as Fregoli il trasformista (episodio 'Fregoli')
 A Slice of Life (1954) as L'amore (segment "Scusi, ma...")
 The Cheerful Squadron (1954) as Il soldato Vergisson
 Il seduttore (1954) as Alberto Ranieri
 It Happened at the Police Station (1954) as Alberto Tadini
 A Parisian in Rome (1954) as Alberto Lucetti
 Camilla (1954) as Il pappagallo in auto (voice, uncredited)
 Un americano a Roma (1954) as Nando Moriconi
 Via Padova 46 (Lo scocciatore) (1954) as Gianrico
 Tripoli, Beautiful Land of Love (1954) as Alberto
 The Art of Getting Along (1955) as Rosario 'Sasà' Scimoni
 The Sign of Venus (1955) as Romolo Proietti
 Buonanotte... avvocato! (1955) as Alberto Santi, advocate
 The Belle of Rome (1955) as Gracco
 Accadde al penitenziario (1955) as Giulio Parmitoni
 Bravissimo (1955) as Ubaldo Impallato
 I pappagalli (1955) as Dr. Alberto Tanzi
 The Letters Page (1955) as Rodolfo Vanzino
 Faccia da mascalzone (1956)
 The Bachelor (1956) as Paolo Anselmi
 Guardia, guardia scelta, brigadiere e maresciallo (1956) as Guardia Alberto Randolfi
 Nero's Weekend (1956) as Nero
 The Virtuous Bigamist (1956) as Mario – le chauffeur du car
 Allow Me, Daddy! (1956) as Rodolfo Nardi
 I pinguini ci guardano (1956) as an animal (voice)
 Arrivano i dollari! (1957) as Alfonso Pasti
 Souvenir d'Italie (1957) as Sergio Battistini
 A Hero of Our Times (1957) as Alberto Menichetti
 Count Max (1957) as Alberto Boccetti
 Doctor and the Healer (1957) as Corrado
 A Farewell to Arms (1957) as Father Galli
 Il marito (1958) as Alberto
 Ladro lui, ladra lei (1958) as Cencio
 Le septième ciel (1958) as Xavier Laurentis
 Fortunella (1958) as Peppino
 Domenica è sempre domenica (1958) as Alberto Carboni
 Venice, the Moon and You (1958) as Bepi
 Girls for the Summer (1958) as Aristarco Battistini
 Nella città l'inferno (1959) as Antonio Zampi, detto Adone (uncredited)
 Policarpo (1959) as l'ambulante che vende ombrelli
 Oh, que Mambo! (1959) as Nando
 Winter Holidays (1959) as Roger Moretti
 The Moralist (1959) as Agostino
 Wild Cats on the Beach (1959) as Alberto
 The Great War (1959) as Oreste Jacovacci
 The Magliari (1959) as Totonno
 Il vedovo (1959) as Alberto Nardi
 Vacations in Majorca (1959) as Anselmo Pandolfini
 Everybody Go Home (1960) as Lt. Alberto Innocenzi
 The Traffic Policeman (1960) as Otello Celletti
 Crimen (1960) as Alberto Franzetti
 Gastone (1960) as Gastone
 The Last Judgment (1961) as Merchant of children
 The Best of Enemies (1961) as Capt. Blasi
 A Difficult Life (1961) as Silvio Magnozzi
 The Police Commissioner (1962) as Dante Lombardozzi
 Mafioso (1962) as Antonio Badalamenti
 Il diavolo (1963) as Amedeo Ferretti
 Il Boom (1963) as Giovanni Alberti
 The Teacher from Vigevano (1963) as Mombelli
 My Wife (1964) as The husband (segments "L'uccellino", "L'automobile") / Sartoletti (segment "Eritrea") / Marco (segments "I miei cari", "Luciana")
 Il disco volante (1964) as Vincenzo Berruti / Marsicano / Don Giuseppe / Conte Momi Crosara
 The Three Faces (1965) as Armando Tucci (segment "Latin Lover")
 Those Magnificent Men in Their Flying Machines (1965) as Count Emilio Ponticelli
 I complessi (1965) as Guglielmo Bertone (segment "Guglielmo il Dentone")
 Thrilling (1965) as Fernando Boccetta (segment "L'autostrada del sole")
 Made in Italy (1965) as Silvio, Errant Husband (segment "5 'La Famiglia', episode 2")
 Tentazioni proibite (1965) as Himself
 Fumo di Londra (1966) as Dante Fontana
 I nostri mariti (1966) as Giovanni Lo Verso (segment "Il Marito di Roberta")
 Sex Quartet (1966) as Giovanni (segment "Fata Marta")
 Pardon, Are You For or Against? (1966) as Tullio Conforti
 The Witches (1967) as Elio Ferocci (segment "Senso Civico")
 Un italiano in America (1967) as Giuseppe
 Be Sick... It's Free (1968) as Doctor Guido Tersilli
 Will Our Heroes Be Able to Find Their Friend Who Has Mysteriously Disappeared in Africa? (1968) as Fausto Di Salvio
 Help Me, My Love (1969) as Giovanni Macchiavelli
 Nell'anno del Signore (1969) as The Friar
 Il Prof. Dott. Guido Tersilli, primario della clinica Villa Celeste, convenzionata con le mutue (1969) as Dr. Guido Tersilli
 Let's Have a Riot (1970) as Don Giuseppe Montanari (segment "Il prete")
 Le coppie (1970) as Giacinto Colonna (segment "La camera") / Antonio (segment "Il leone")
The President of Borgorosso Football Club (1970) as Benito Fornaciari
 In Prison Awaiting Trial (1971) as Giuseppe Di Noi
 A Girl in Australia (1971) as Amedeo Battipaglia
 The Scientific Cardplayer (1972) as Peppino
 The Most Wonderful Evening of My Life (1972) as Alfredo Rossi
 Roma (1972) as Himself – Interviewé (uncredited)
 My Brother Anastasia (1973) as Father Salvatore Anastasia
 Polvere di stelle (1973) as Mimmo Adami
 Finché c'è guerra c'è speranza (1974) as Pietro Chiocca
 Di che segno sei? (1975) as Nando Moriconi (segment "Il fuoco")
 Il comune senso del pudore (1976, first segment) as Giacinto Colonna
 Strange Occasion (1976) as Mons. Ascanio La Costa (segment "L'Ascensore")
 An Average Little Man (1977) as Giovanni Vivaldi
 I nuovi mostri (1977) as Il principe (segment "First Aid") / Il figlio (segment "Come una regina") / L'attore (segment "Elogio funebre")
 The Witness (1978) as Antonio Berti
 Where Are You Going on Holiday? (1978) as Remo Proietti (segment "Le vacanze intelligenti")
 Traffic Jam (1979) as Dr. De Benedetti, lawyer
 Hypochondriac (1979) as Argante
 Catherine and I (1980) as Enrico Menotti
 Il Marchese del Grillo (1981) as Onofrio Del Grillo / Gasperino
 I Know That You Know That I Know (1982) as Fabio Bonetti
 In viaggio con papà (1982) as Armando Ferretti
 Il tassinaro (1983) as Pietro Marchetti
 Everybody in Jail (1984) as Judge Annibale Salvemini
 Bertoldo, Bertoldino e Cacasenno (1984) as Friar Cipolla
 I Am an ESP (1985) as Roberto Razzi
 Troppo forte (1986) as Count Giangiacomo Pigna Corelli in Selci
 Un tassinaro a New York (1987) as Pietro Marchetti
 Una botta di vita (1988) as Elvio Battistini
 I promessi sposi (1989, TV Mini-Series) as Don Abbondio
 L'avaro (1990) as Arpagone
 In the Name of the Sovereign People (1990) as Marchese Arquati
 Vacanze di Natale '91 (1991) as Sabino
 Acquitted for Having Committed the Deed (1992) as Emilio Garrone
 Nestore, l'ultima corsa (1994) as Gaetano
 Romanzo di un giovane povero (1995) as Mr. Bartoloni
 Incontri proibiti (1998) as Armando Andreoli (final film role)

Director

 Fumo di Londra (1966)
 Scusi, lei è favorevole o contrario? (1966)
 Un italiano in America (1967)
 Amore mio, aiutami (1969)
 Le coppie (1970, segment "La camera")
 Polvere di stelle (1973)
 Finché c'è guerra c'è speranza (1974)
 Il comune senso del pudore (1976)
 Dove vai in vacanza? (1978, segment "Le vacanze intelligenti")
 Io e Caterina (1980)
 Io so che tu sai che io so (1982)
 In viaggio con papà (1982)
 Il tassinaro (1983)
 Tutti dentro (1984)
 Un tassinaro a New York (1987)
 Acquitted for Having Committed the Deed (1992)
 Nestore, l'ultima corsa (1994)
 Incontri proibiti (1998)

Dubbing roles

Animation
Narrator of segment 10 in Make Mine Music

Live action
Oliver Hardy in Laurel and Hardy (1939-1951 redubs)
Ollie in Swiss Miss
Ollie in The Flying Deuces
Ollie in A Chump at Oxford
Pickpocket in Casablanca
Jim Brennan in The Valley of Decision
Nino in Abbasso la ricchezza!
Ernie Bishop in It's a Wonderful Life
Woody Herman in New Orleans
Monte Loeffler in Humoresque
Bicycle vendor in Bicycle Thieves
Ercole Nardi in Sunday in August
Fashion show presenter in Story of a Love Affair
Narrator in Father's Dilemma
Spike MacManus in State of the Union
Sam in Somewhere in the Night
Steven Warren in The Spiral Staircase
Sergeant Beaufort in Fort Apache
Professor Stevens in Abbott and Costello Meet Frankenstein
Captain de Trevignac in The Garden of Allah
Kid Callahan in City for Conquest
Sid in Duel in the Sun
Peter Virgil in Romance on the High Seas (singing voice)
Hugo Barnstead in The Strawberry Blonde
Jeb Rand in Pursued
Jim Fairways in Rachel and the Stranger (singing voice)
James Cody in The Treasure of the Sierra Madre
Ed Landers in Cheyenne
Tommy Chamberlain in The Bachelor and the Bobby-Soxer
Neff in Panic in the Streets
Marino in Body and Soul
Ed Garzah in The Naked City
Dakota in Destination Tokyo
Bill Hughes in You Can't Take It with You
Frank Reardon in Blood on the Moon
Giuseppe in Sahara
Hawley in The Gal Who Took the West
Fred Lord in Sorry, Wrong Number
Nat Sperling in The Big Clock
Torquato Torquati in Where Is Freedom?
Major A. M. Bagley in Air Force
John Withers in The Letter
Cole Porter in Night and Day (singing voice)
David Winthrop in Mexican Hayride
Bartender / Hotel clerk in Tall in the Saddle

Theatre

Actor
 1936–1937: San Giovanni with Aldo Fabrizi and Anna Fougez
 1938–1939: Ma in campagna è un'altra... rosa (In the country it's another... rose), with Guido Riccioli and Nanda Primavera
 1941–1942: Tutto l'oro del mondo (All the gold in the world), with Guido Fineschi and Maria Donati
 1942–1943: Teatro della caricatura (Theatre of the caricature), with Fanfulla
 1943–1944: Ritorna Za-Bum, by Marcello Marchesi, directed by Mario Mattòli
 Sai che ti dico? (You know what I am saying to you?), by Marcello Marchesi, directed by Mario Mattòli
 1944–1945: Un mondo di armonie (A world of harmonies), musical revue by Alberto Semprini
 Imputati... alziamoci! (Suspects... arise!), by Michele Galdieri
 1945–1946: Soffia so'..., by Pietro Garinei and Sandro Giovannini
 Soffia so'... n. 2, by Pietro Garinei and Sandro Giovannini
 1947–1948: E lui dice... (And he says...), by Benecoste, directed by Oreste Biancoli and Adolfo Celi
 1952–1953: Gran baraonda (Total chaos), by Pietro Garinei and Sandro Giovannini, with Wanda Osiris

Composer and singer
 1966: You never told me (Sordi – Piccioni) sung by Lydia MacDonald in the movie Fumo di Londra and in Italian by Mina with title Breve amore
 1966: Richmond bridge (Sordi – Piccioni) sung by Lydia MacDonald in the movie Fumo di Londra
 1973: Ma 'ndo... Hawaii? (Sordi – Piccioni) sung by Alberto Sordi and Monica Vitti in the movie Polvere di stelle

References

External links

 
 
 
 

1920 births
2003 deaths
Best Musical or Comedy Actor Golden Globe (film) winners
Burials at Campo Verano
David di Donatello Career Award winners
David di Donatello winners
Deaths from bronchitis
Deaths from pneumonia in Lazio
Italian film directors
Italian male comedians
Italian male composers
Italian male film actors
Italian male radio actors
Italian Roman Catholics
Italian male screenwriters
Italian male stage actors
Italian male television actors
Italian male voice actors
Knights Grand Cross of the Order of Merit of the Italian Republic
Male actors from Rome
Nastro d'Argento winners
Recipients of the Italian Order of Merit for Culture and Art
Silver Bear for Best Actor winners
20th-century Italian male actors
20th-century Italian male singers
20th-century Italian male writers
20th-century Italian screenwriters